Barberville is a small village located primarily in the town of Hopkinton, but also extending into Richmond in Washington County, Rhode Island, United States. Barberville is located to the north of Hopkinton's principal village, Hope Valley and uses Hope Valley's zip code, 02832.

History
Barberville has a short history. It was never an extremely populated place; the 1880 census reported a population of 49, and a 1902 gazetteer counted 34.  Its genesis comes from when Joseph T. Barber built a dam and sawmill in 1829.  The mill burned in a fire in 1869.  Barberville was the site of one of Hopkinton's original school districts.

Today, the only major road that passes through Barberville is Arcadia Road. The Wood River, which serves as the border between Hopkinton and Richmond, runs through Barberville and the Wood-Pawcatuck Watershed Association is headquartered in the village.

References

Villages in Washington County, Rhode Island
Villages in Rhode Island